BS13 may refer to:
BS13, a BS postcode area for Bristol, England
BS-13 María de Maeztu, a Spanish Maritime Safety and Rescue Society tugboat		
BS 13 Specification for Structural Steel for Shipbuilding, a British Standard